Gary B.B. Coleman (January 1, 1947February 21, 1994) was an American soul blues guitarist, singer, songwriter and record producer.

Originally a local musician turned blues promoter and session musician, Coleman recorded his debut album in 1986, which was re-released by Ichiban Records. He issued several other albums and produced most of Ichiban's blues catalogue until his death, in 1994. On many occasions, Coleman undertook multi-instrumentalist duties in the recording studio. He acknowledged both B.B. King, with his "B.B." moniker, and a fellow Texan, Freddie King.

Biography
Coleman was born in Paris, Texas. He was working alongside Freddie King by the age of 15. He later supported Lightnin' Hopkins in concert and went on to form his own group. At this time he started simultaneously booking acts into nightclubs across three states, Texas, Oklahoma, and Colorado. This dual lifestyle in the Southwest continued for nearly twenty years. In 1985, he created his own independent record label, Mr. B's Records, and issued a single, "One Eyed Woman", and his debut album, Nothin' but the Blues, the following year. The album proved to be popular. Ichiban Records signed Coleman to a recording contract and duly re-released Nothin' but the Blues on its label in 1987.

If You Can Beat Me Rockin''' (1988) followed, and in the same year Coleman's duties with Ichiban expanded to include record production for other acts, songwriting, and acting as an A&R scout. He released six more albums up to 1992 and was responsible for production duties on albums by Blues Boy Willie, Chick Willis, Little Johnny Taylor, and Buster Benton (Money's the Name of the Game, 1989).

He continued to write material for others and sometimes played guitar and keyboards on their records. His own albums featured songs he wrote, such as "I Fell in Love on a One Night Stand" and "If You Can Beat Me Rockin' (You Can Have My Chair)".

Coleman continued to combine various roles successfully until his early death, in 1994.

DiscographyNothin' but the Blues (1987), Ichiban (number 74, Billboard R&B chart)If You Can Beat Me Rockin'... (1988), IchibanOne Night Stand (1989), IchibanDancin' My Blues Away (1990), IchibanRomance Without Finance Is a Nuisance (1991), IchibanThe Best of Gary B.B. Coleman (1991), IchibanToo Much Weekend (1992), IchibanCocaine Annie'' (1994), Icehouse Records

See also
List of soul-blues musicians

References

External links
Biography and discography . Bluescritic.com

1947 births
1994 deaths
American blues guitarists
American male guitarists
American blues singers
Record producers from Texas
Songwriters from Texas
Music promoters
Singers from Texas
Soul-blues musicians
People from Paris, Texas
20th-century African-American male singers
20th-century American businesspeople
20th-century American guitarists
African-American guitarists
Guitarists from Texas
African-American male songwriters